Ultimate++, also known as U++ or Upp - is a C++ rapid application development framework which aims to reduce the code complexity of typical desktop applications by extensively exploiting C++ features. Programs created with it can work on multiple operating systems and hardware architectures without the need to write platform specific code.

It possesses its own integrated development environment called TheIDE that is designed to handle all library features.

Features
The major Ultimate++ features are:
 Supports Unix/Linux/FreeBSD (X11), Microsoft Windows and macOS.
 Compatible with C++20
 Includes an IDE and a GUI designer.
 Uses heavily RAII and  auto pointers-like mechanisms to avoid manual memory management and even to limit the use of pointers in the code 
 Can emulate native widgets look and feel. On X11 systems, Ultimate++ supports GTK+ widgets look and feel.
 Standard distribution comes with Ultimate++ sources included, even the IDE ones.
 Uses  as template system instead of STL.
 Database management and application development with SQL
 Many technologies like Topic++ (Documents editor), Assist++ (Code completion, analyzer), Icon designer and more are built in to the U++

Hello World
The following example creates a C++ application with "Hello world!" button:

#include <CtrlLib/CtrlLib.h>

using namespace Upp;

class MyApp : public TopWindow 
{
public:
    MyApp() 
    {
        Title("Hello world");
        button.SetLabel("Hello world!");
        button << [=] {
            if (PromptYesNo("Button was clicked. Do you want to quit?"))
                Break();
        };
        Add(button.HSizePos(100, 100).VSizePos(100, 100));
    }
    
private:
    Button button;
};

GUI_APP_MAIN
{
    MyApp().Run();
}

Software built on Ultimate++ 
Example applications using Ultimate++ are:
 Openwind - an open-source wind farm design software
 UppCAD - a multipurpose CAD system

See also

 GTK+
 Widget toolkit
 List of widget toolkits

References

External links
 
 Official GitHub
 Official Sourceforge

Widget toolkits
Application programming interfaces
Free computer libraries
X-based libraries
C++ libraries
Cross-platform software
Free integrated development environments
Linux integrated development environments
Software using the BSD license
Articles with example C++ code
Programming tools for Windows